John Ronald Napier (born 21 August 1963) is a Scottish curler from St. Andrews. Napier has curled in the Olympics once for the Douglas Dryburgh team representing Great Britain in the 1998 Winter Olympics. Ronnie and his team came in sixth place out of ten teams. Managing to beat Japan and Denmark as well as two other teams in the process.

References

External links

1963 births
Living people
Scottish male curlers
British male curlers
Olympic curlers of Great Britain
Curlers at the 1998 Winter Olympics